Zervos is the name of a folk dance in Karpathos and Eastern Rumelia (Northern Thrace - Βόρεια Θράκη)(Ανατολική Ρωμυλία) which is danced in Greece and generally in the Balkans anticlockwise (to the left). The music is generally played with a lyre (Kemenche) (or violin), lute, accordion and mandolin (or gaida).

See also
Greek music
Greek folk music
Syrtos
Greek dances
Music of Thrace

External links

Greek dances
European folk dances
Greek music